The Kansas City Southern Bonnet Carré Spillway Bridge is a bridge that carries a Kansas City Southern Railway rail line over the Bonnet Carré Spillway in St. Charles Parish.

The bridge is owned and maintained by the Kansas City Southern Railway corporation and is used by Kansas City Southern Railway freight trains.

See also
List of bridges in the United States

References

External links 
Kansas City Southern Corporate Website

Railroad bridges in Louisiana
Kansas City Southern Railway bridges
Buildings and structures in St. Charles Parish, Louisiana
Transportation in St. Charles Parish, Louisiana
Bridges completed in 1936
1936 establishments in Louisiana